Louisville's major employers include United Parcel Service, Ford Motor Company and GE Appliances.

Major employers

 United Parcel Service
UPS Airlines
 Ford Motor Company
 Kentucky Truck Plant
 Louisville Assembly Plant
 GE Appliances
 Humana Inc.
 Norton Healthcare
 UofL Health
 Yum! Brands
 Papa John's International
 Brown-Forman
 Anthem
 Kindred Healthcare
 Roman Catholic Archdiocese of Louisville
 LG&E and KU Energy

Fortune 100
The list below represents Louisville corporations that have a Fortune 100 status as of May 2012.

Fortune 500
The list below represents Louisville corporations that have a Fortune 500 status as of May 2012.

See also
 Economy of Louisville, Kentucky
 Notable companies and organizations based in Louisville

References

Economy of Louisville, Kentucky
Employers
Louisville, employers